Yaga-shala is a sacrificial hall in Hinduism where a fire sacrifice (yajna) is conducted. It also refers to the site of the sacrifice during the kumbhabhishekam ceremony of a temple. The various characteristics and the specifications related to the construction of a yaga-shala are described in the Shulba Sutras.

References 

Hindu worship